GT, Gt or G-T may refer to:

Arts and entertainment

Games
 GT Interactive, an American video game developer 
 GameTrailers, a video game website
 Golden Tee Golf, golf video game
 Gran Turismo (series), a series of racing video games

Music
 Gran Turismo (album), a 1998 album by the Cardigans
 Gyllene Tider, a Swedish pop group
 Groove Terminator, Australian electronic music artist

Other media
 Dragon Ball GT, an anime television series
 GameTrailers TV with Geoff Keighley, a television series
 Gay Times, a UK culture magazine for gay males, known also as GT
 Gran Torino (film), a 2008 drama starring Clint Eastwood
 The Grand Tour (TV series), a series shown on Amazon Prime

Cars
 Grand tourer (Italian: gran turismo), usually a high-performance luxury automobile designed for long-distance driving

Car models

Production models
 Alfa Romeo GT, a 2003–2010 Italian sports car
 Bentley Continental GT, a 2003–present British sports car
 Buick Excelle GT, a 2009–present Chinese compact car
 Ford GT, a 2004–2006, 2016–present American sports car
 Maserati 3500 GT, a 1957–1964 Italian sports car
 Mercedes-AMG GT, a 2015–present German sports car
 MG GT, a 2014–present Chinese compact sedan
 Opel GT, a 1968–1973 German sports car
 Opel GT (roadster), a 2007–2009 German sports car
 Porsche Carrera GT, a 2003–2007 German sports car
 Daewoo LeMans, a 1986–2016 Korean compact car, sold in Canada as Asüna GT
 Geely Borui, a 2015–present Chinese mid-size sedan, sold in Russia as Geely Emgrand GT
 Maserati GranTurismo, a 2007–2019 Italian sports car, abbreviated as Maserati GT

Concepts and prototypes
 ArcFox GT, a 2019 Chinese electric sports car prototype
 BYD E-SEED GT, a 2019 Chinese sports car concept
 Chevrolet Corvair Monza GT, a 1962 American sports car prototype
 Geely GT, a 2008 Chinese sports car concept
 Kia GT, a 2011 South Korean mid-size sedan concept
 Lightning GT, a 2008 British electric sports car prototype
 Mitsubishi GT-PHEV, a 2016 Japanese mid-size SUV concept
 Opel GT, a 2016 German sports car concept

Trim levels and variants
 BMW GT, an abbreviation short for BMW's Gran Turismo fastback variants
 Chevrolet Vega GT, a sports package for the 1970–1977 Chevrolet Vega American subcompact car
 Ford Mustang GT, a trim level for the 1964–present Ford Mustang American sports car
 Karma Revero GT, the updated version of the 2017–present Karma Revero American hybrid electric sports sedan
 Kia Stinger GT, a trim level for the 2018–present Kia Stinger South Korean sports sedan
 Lancia Aurelia GT, a coupe variant of the 1950–1958 Lancia Aurelia Italian full-size car
 Lancia Flaminia GT, a coupe variant of the 1957–1964 Lancia Flaminia Italian full-size car
 Škoda Kamiq GT, a sport package for the 2018–present Škoda Kamiq Chinese subcompact SUV
 Škoda Kodiaq GT, a fastback variant of the 2016–present Škoda Kodiaq Czech mid-size SUV
 WEY VV7 GT, a fastback variant of the 2017–present WEY VV7 Chinese mid-size SUV
 WEY P8 GT, the PHEV variant of the VV7 GT

Motorsport
 Blancpain GT Series, an auto racing series
FIA GT Championship, an international sports car racing series
 Grand Touring, used by the IMSA GT Championship

Companies
 GT Bicycles, a large American manufacturer of road, mountain, and BMX bicycles
 Goodyear Tire and Rubber Company, a multinational tire manufacturer
 Göteborgs-Tidningen, a Swedish newspaper
 Grant Thornton LLP, a public accounting firm
 Greenberg Traurig, an international law firm
 Goodson-Todman Productions, later Mark Goodson Productions, now part of FremantleMedia, American game show production company

Places
 Georgetown, Guyana, the capital of Guyana
 Guatemala, by ISO country code

Schools
 Georgia Tech (formal name: Georgia Institute of Technology), an American university
 St Joseph's College, Gregory Terrace, a Catholic boys' school in Australia
 Gordon Technical High School, now DePaul College Prep, a Catholic high school in Chicago, Illinois
 Graettinger–Terril Community School District

Science and technology

Biology and medicine
 Gain of thyroid, or Thyroid's secretory capacity, a calculated parameter for diagnosis of thyroid disorders
 Glanzmann's thrombasthenia, a rare medical condition
 Giant trevally, a species of fish from the family Carangidae
 Glutamyl transpeptidase, a marker of liver disease

Computing and telecommunications
 .gt, the Internet country code top-level domain for Guatemala
 Antenna gain-to-noise-temperature, (G/T), a figure of merit for satellite antennas
 Gigabyte Technology, a computer hardware manufacturer
 Gigatransfer, a number of data transfers (or operations)
 Global Title, an address used for routing signaling messages on telecommunications networks
 Globus Toolkit, a software framework for implementing computational grids
 Google Talk, Google's instant-messaging client
 Google Translate, Google's translation service
 Graph theory, the branch of discrete mathematics dealing with the data structure 
 "Greater than", a relational operator used in computer languages

Other uses in science and technology
 Gas turbine, a rotary engine that extracts energy from a flow of combustion gas
 Geometry & Topology, a mathematical journal
 Gigatesla, an SI unit of magnetic flux density
 Gigatonne, (Gt), a metric unit of mass
 Gross tonnage, a unitless measure of the size of merchant ships
 Grounded theory, a method for generating theories, especially in the social sciences
 Group technology, a method for organization of a manufacturing system

Transportation
 Grand Trunk Railway (1852–1923), a former railroad in Canada and northeast US
 Grand Trunk Road, a highway connecting Bangladesh, India, Pakistan and Afghanistan

Other uses
 Gifted and talented education, a broad term used in the education of certain children
 Gin and tonic, a drink